McEwen is a city in Humphreys County, Tennessee, United States. The population was 1,750 at the 2010 census.

Geography
McEwen is located in eastern Humphreys County at  (36.108810, -87.634974). U.S. Route 70 passes through the center of the city, leading east  to Dickson and west  to Waverly, the Humphreys county seat. Tennessee State Route 231 (Main Street) leads north  to Erin.

Demographics

2020 census

As of the 2020 United States census, there were 1,643 people, 605 households, and 405 families residing in the city.

2000 census
As of the census of 2000, there were 1,702 people, 725 households, and 476 families residing in the city. The population density was 892.1 people per square mile (344.1/km2). There were 775 housing units at an average density of 406.2 per square mile (156.7/km2). The racial makeup of the city was 98.65% White, 0.35% African American, 0.18% Native American, 0.06% Asian, 0.06% Pacific Islander, 0.12% from other races, and 0.59% from two or more races. Hispanic or Latino of any race were 0.53% of the population.

There were 725 households, out of which 30.8% had children under the age of 18 living with them, 51.0% were married couples living together, 10.6% had a female householder with no husband present, and 34.3% were non-families. 30.5% of all households were made up of individuals, and 14.3% had someone living alone who was 65 years of age or older. The average household size was 2.34 and the average family size was 2.92.

In the city, the population was spread out, with 25.6% under the age of 18, 7.9% from 18 to 24, 27.7% from 25 to 44, 23.1% from 45 to 64, and 15.7% who were 65 years of age or older. The median age was 37 years. For every 100 females, there were 87.9 males. For every 100 females age 18 and over, there were 81.9 males.

The median income for a household in the city was $30,682, and the median income for a family was $39,167. Males had a median income of $30,417 versus $22,109 for females. The per capita income for the city was $17,375. About 11.2% of families and 15.8% of the population were below the poverty line, including 20.0% of those under age 18 and 14.3% of those age 65 or over.

Culture
McEwen is the home of the Irish Picnic, a fundraiser for the local St. Patrick Church and School. It was established in 1854 and was recognised in 1988 by the Guinness Book of World Records as "The World's Largest Outdoor Barbecue". The event is held annually on the last Friday and Saturday in July.

Notable residents
Russ Craft, NFL player
Ralph Emery, country music disc jockey and television host
Daryl Mosley, bluegrass musician
Beasley Smith, composer and big-band musician

References

Cities in Tennessee
Cities in Humphreys County, Tennessee